Alliocera is a genus of flies in the family Stratiomyidae.

Species
Alliocera graeca Saunders, 1845

References

Stratiomyidae
Brachycera genera
Monotypic Brachycera genera
Taxa named by William Wilson Saunders
Diptera of Europe